The Adventure Cycling Route Network, developed by Adventure Cycling Association since 1974, comprises over 52,000 miles of routes for bicycle touring in the U.S. and Canada and is the largest such network in North America.

Overview 
The Adventure Cycling Route Network consists of mostly rural bicycle routes varying in length from loops of a few hundred miles to coast-to-coast routes of more than 4,000 miles. The routes eschew high-traffic roads and big cities for rural two-lane highways and small towns. Routes have been designed to allow for daily stops for food, supplies, and lodging.

History 
Adventure Cycling's first route was the TransAmerica Bicycle Trail, which they developed leading up to the 1976 Bikecentennial celebration.

United States Bicycle Route System 
Adventure Cycling is the only national organization providing staff support to develop the United States Bicycle Route System (USBRS), which when complete will comprise over 50,000 miles of bicycle routes connecting urban, suburban, and rural areas throughout the U.S.

Routes 
 Adirondack Park Loop
 Allegheny Mountains Loop
 Arkansas High Country Route
 Atlantic Coast Bicycle Route
 Bicycle Route 66
 Chicago to New York City Bicycle Route
 Florida Connector
 Grand Canyon Connector
 Great Divide Mountain Bike Route
 Great Parks Bicycle Route
 Great Rivers South Bicycle Route
 Green Mountains Loop
 Idaho Hot Springs Mountain Bike Route
 Lake Erie Connector
 Lewis & Clark Trail Bicycle Route
 North Lakes Bicycle Route
 Northern Tier Bicycle Route
 Pacific Coast Bicycle Route
Parks, Peaks, and Prairies Bicycle Route
 Sierra Cascades Bicycle Route
 Southern Tier Bicycle Route
 Tidewater Potomac Heritage Bicycle Route
 TransAmerica Bicycle Trail
 Underground Railroad Bicycle Route
 Utah Cliffs Loop
 Washington Parks Bicycle Route
 Western Express Bicycle Route

References

External links
 Interactive Network Map

Cycling in North America